Slateford is an unincorporated community in Northampton County, Pennsylvania. It is part of the Lehigh Valley metropolitan area, which has a population of 861,899 and is the 68th most populous metropolitan area in the U.S. as of the 2020 census. 

The nearest communities are Stroudsburg to the north and Portland to the south. Slateford is approximately one mile (1.4 km) from the Delaware Water Gap.  Its name comes from its location at the edge of the Northampton Slate Belt. Slateford is part of the Lehigh Valley metropolitan area.

Slate production began in the area as early as 1808, making it one of the earliest such sites in the United States. Immigrants from Wales and England came in the 19th century to work in the quarries. Quarries and slate production factories operated in the area until 1917.  

Slateford is the location of Slateford Junction, the connection between the Lackawanna Railroad's old mainline and the Lackawanna Cut-Off.

Notes

Unincorporated communities in Northampton County, Pennsylvania
Unincorporated communities in Pennsylvania